Pori Airport  is an airport in Pori, Finland. It has two check-in desks, and a cafeteria service. During 2011 Pori Airport served 54,056 passengers, an increase of 25.2% from previous year. However, in 2014 it was down to 24 983.

History 
During Continuation War, Pori airfield was used by Luftwaffe. The aviation equipment depot Feldluftpark 3/XI Pori operating at the airfield was from where Germans dispatched aircraft to the north and carried out major overhauls.

Facilities 

The Finnish Aviation Academy is a flight school based at Pori Airport. As is the Satakunta Parachute club "Satakunnan Laskuvarjourheilijat". Flight training for private pilots (PPL/LAPL-licences) is given by local flight school Porin Lentotilaus Oy.

Airlines and destinations

Statistics

Ground transportation

See also 
 List of airports in Finland
 List of the largest airports in the Nordic countries

References

External links

 Finavia – Pori Airport
 AIP Finland – Pori Airport
 
 

Airports in Finland
Buildings and structures in Pori